The INS Tarshish (Tarshish) is a Sa'ar 4.5-class missile boat of the Israeli Navy, built by Israel Shipyards Ltd. and commissioned in June 1995.

See also
 INS Sufa
 INS Herev

Sa'ar 4.5-class missile boats
1995 ships
Ships built in Israel
Naval ships of Israel
Missile boats of the Israeli Navy